Fareed Town is a new town in the H-15 Sector of Islamabad. The H sectors of Islamabad are mostly dedicated to educational and health institutions. National University of Sciences and Technology covers a major portion of sector H-12.

References

Islamabad